"Out of the Silent Planet" is a single from the Iron Maiden album Brave New World, released in 2000.

Synopsis
The single features two live tracks from the 1999 Ed Hunter tour, which featured the band reunited with guitarist Adrian Smith and vocalist Bruce Dickinson, as well as the promotional video for "Out of the Silent Planet." Cover art was by Mark Wilkinson. According to interviews with band members, the song was primarily influenced by the science fiction movie Forbidden Planet. (In addition, the name "Out Of The Silent Planet" is a reference to the 1938 C.S. Lewis science fiction novel by the same title.)

It's a peculiarity in that despite being one of only 2 singles from the album, this was not played on the majority of the accompanying world tour--only in a few encores in South America.

The guitar solo in the song is played by Janick Gers.

The music video is a recording of the band's European leg of their Brave New World Tour.

The regular single and the limited edition numbered single  were both the same, which was unusual for Iron Maiden releases. The 12" Picture Disc LP had the limited edition cover with Eddie at the podium on side A and the reporters on side B.  All three versions had the same tracks, also unusual for multiple Iron Maiden singles of the same title.

Track listing

CD versions

 "Out of the Silent Planet" (Edited Version) (Janick Gers, Steve Harris, Bruce Dickinson) – 4:10
 "Wasted Years" (live - Filaforum, Milano, Italy, 23 September 1999) (Adrian Smith) – 5:07
 "Aces High" (live - Plaza Del Toros, Madrid, Spain, 26 September 1999) (Harris) – 5:24
 "Out of the Silent Planet" (video) (Gers, Harris, Dickinson) – 4:10

12" Picture Disc

 A1 - "Out of the Silent Planet" (Edited Version) (Gers, Harris, Dickinson) – 4:10
 B1 - "Wasted Years" (live - Filaforum, Milano, Italy, 23 September 1999) (Smith) – 5:07
 B2 - "Aces High" (live - Plaza Del Toros, Madrid, Spain, 26 September 1999) (Harris) – 5:24

7" Red Vinyl

 A - "Out of the Silent Planet" (Edited Version) (Gers, Harris, Dickinson)
 B - "Aces High" (live) (Harris)

Personnel
Production credits are adapted from the CD, and picture disc covers.
Iron Maiden
Bruce Dickinson – lead vocals
Dave Murray – rhythm guitar
Janick Gers – lead guitar, 
Adrian Smith – rhythm guitar, backing vocals ("Wasted Years")
Steve Harris – bass guitar, co-producer ("Out of the Silent Planet")
Nicko McBrain – drums
Production
Kevin Shirley – producer, mixing, editing ("Out of the Silent Planet")
George Marino – mastering ("Out of the Silent Planet")
Doug Hall – mixing ("Wasted Years", "Aces High")
Simon Heyworth – mastering ("Wasted Years", "Aces High")
Mark Wilkinson – sleeve illustration
Hugh Gilmour – packaging
Ross Halfin – photography

Charts

References 

Iron Maiden songs
2000 singles
Songs written by Steve Harris (musician)
Songs written by Bruce Dickinson
Songs written by Janick Gers
2000 songs
EMI Records singles
Song recordings produced by Kevin Shirley